David Gashoski (born 2 September 1996) is a Macedonian handball player who plays for HC Rabotnichki.

References

External links

1996 births
Living people
Macedonian male handball players
Sportspeople from Skopje